Romana Graham (born ) is a New Zealand rugby union footballer. His regular playing position is lock. Having previously played for the Chiefs in Super Rugby and Waikato in the ITM Cup it was announced Graham would be joining Aviva Premiership side Exeter Chiefs After playing for Exeter Graham then signed for La Rochelle on a two-year contract.

References

External links 
Chiefs profile
Waikato profile
Yahoo NZ profile
itsrugby.co.uk profile

Living people
1986 births
New Zealand rugby union players
Chiefs (rugby union) players
Waikato rugby union players
Rugby union locks
Rugby union players from Hastings, New Zealand
Exeter Chiefs players
Plymouth Albion R.F.C. players
New Zealand expatriate rugby union players
New Zealand expatriate sportspeople in England
Expatriate rugby union players in England
Māori All Blacks players